Geographies of the Holocaust is a 2014 book published by Indiana University Press, based on a 2007 conference of the same name at the Center for Advanced Holocaust Studies.

References

2014 non-fiction books
Indiana University Press books
Books about the Holocaust